Constantin "Jumate" Rădulescu (30 May 1924 – 1 January 2001), commonly known as Dr. Constantin Rădulescu, was a Romanian doctor, footballer and manager. As a footballer he played mainly as a midfielder.

In 2005, as a tribute to the work done in building and rising the club, CFR Cluj renamed its stadium as Stadionul Dr. Constantin Rădulescu.

Club career

Early years of football (Olympia and Sportul)
Born in Bucharest, Rădulescu started his career at Olympia București then moved to Sportul Studențesc in 1942, for which he played in 8 matches in the Divizia A.

Universitatea Cluj
In 1943 the doctor signed with Universitatea Cluj, team that played at Sibiu in that period as a consequence of the territorial agreement known as the Second Vienna Award, by which Northern Transylvania became part of the Kingdom of Hungary as a result of World War II events. That team would be known as a symbol of the Romanian resistance in Transylvania. In 1949 he left "U" as a result of some misunderstandings and would declare later in his book, O viaţă închinată fotbalului (A life dedicated to football): Honestly, I split hard and regretfully from this wonderful team, which deserves any superlatives.

CFR Cluj
After leaving "U", Constantin Rădulescu chose to continue his career at the rival CFR, known at the time as Locomotiva, a small team that still did not seem to become the Universitatea's bitter rival. For CFR he played 6 years and retired in 1956, at only 31 years old due to a serious injury.

Manager career

Early years
After retirement the doctor started immediately his football manager career at CFR and after some seasons in the Divizia B and Divizia C he signed with his first love, Universitatea Cluj, known at that time as Știința, but only resisting one season in this position.

The Creator of CFR Cluj
In the summer of 1963 he went back to CFR Cluj, known at that time as CSM Cluj, and would begin the building of the team that later would become the bitter rival of Universitatea. In 1969 he succeeded the first Divizia A promotion in the history of CFR, managing to maintain the team on the first stage of the Romanian football until 1976 and at the end of 1972–73 season, a 5th place, the best ranking in history of the club until 2006. These performances are all the more incredible as the team has inadequate training, organizational and financial conditions, Rădulescu was telling in his book: No finances and players, no headquarters, secretary or organizer. So we started in the first league in 1969.

After relegation he moved back to "U" for one season, then reaching lower league teams such as CUG Cluj or Sticla Arieșul Turda.

In 1992 at 68 years old the doctor returned to his creation, CFR, and managed the team for 3 years in Liga III, helping at the creation of the team that would promote a year later.

Playing and Managing style
As a player, Rădulescu turned throw-ins into real corner kicks.

As a manager he is considered a real Alex Ferguson of CFR Cluj by former player Marius Bretan and former player Romică Petrescu said: Ajax and CFR used the same training methods. The training cycle was taken from Ajax, with two training sessions on Tuesday, two on Thursday, free on Wednesday. Everything was done counter-clockwise, after pulse, after tension.

Augustin Ţegean, a CFR legend described him: A distinct character from all points of view: tough, severe, does not give up his principles. He always told us that he was only allowed to make fun because he was from Bucharest. He was a strong personality, we all respected him. We were afraid of him. [..] I can say he was using new methods for those times. He explained the game schemes on the board. The marks were made man-to-man. Everyone knew exactly what area to cover on the pitch. His methods were the most modern.

Trivia
He refused the national team so that he would not lose his doctor's position, told the doctor's daughter, Ioana Stanca Gidro. In 1972, the Minister of Transport asked him to take over Rapid București, but he refused again, this time using a tertip, demanding that Rică Răducanu, a legend of Rapid, to be kicked out.

Personal life
Rădulescu's daughter, Stanca Ioana Gidro is a lawyer and former dean of the Cluj-Napoca Bar, among other.

References

External links
 Constantin Rădulescu at labtof.ro

1924 births
2001 deaths
Footballers from Bucharest
20th-century Romanian physicians
Romanian footballers
Association football midfielders
Liga I players
Olympia București players
FC Sportul Studențesc București players
FC Universitatea Cluj players
Liga II players
CFR Cluj players
Romanian football managers
CFR Cluj managers
FC Universitatea Cluj managers